Duel to the Death is a 1983 Hong Kong wuxia film starring Norman Chui and Damian Lau. It is the directorial debut of Ching Siu-tung.

Plot
In 16th century, during the Ming dynasty era, every ten years the greatest swordsman from Japan faces the greatest swordsman from China in a duel to the death for their nation's honor. As a duel approaches, Chinese champion Ching Wan (Damian Lau) and Japanese champion Hashimoto (Norman Chui) uncover a plot to rig the fight.

Ching Wan, known as "Lord of the Sword", is a peaceful and contemplative martial artist who has trained with Shaolin monks as well as a mischievous hermit. By contrast, Hashimoto is a pitiless yet honorable samurai. One night after drinking with his compatriots Hashimoto is engaged by a masked assassin, after a brief but intense clash Hashimoto wins but realizes he inadvertently killed his sensei; his master using his death to cement the Samurai's resolve as a final lesson before the duel. 

Throughout the days leading up to the duel, ninja led by a Japanese official under orders by the Shogun of Japan collude with the Chinese wardens to kidnap famous fighters and sabotage the duel for Hashimoto so that Japan may study and improve upon their martial arts; as well as that the head of a famous Chinese sword school can credit his students as champions of China upon Hashimoto's death. The honorable samurai, however, does not go along with the plan, Hashimoto instead wants a fair duel. Ching Wan as well rebuffs his Chinese compatriots, telling them that they are only pawns in the Shogun's plan. 

Together, Ching Wan and Hashimoto fight the various conspirators and manage to free the captives. Afterwards, Ching Wan sees no point in going forward with the duel, having grown weary of the bloodshed the duel had fueled, but Hashimoto believes it his duty to complete what he had journeyed out to do, and kills Ching Wan's master to force his hand. The two warriors engage in a gravity-defying sword fight around a rocky coastline.

In one final charge, both swordsmen mortally wound one another, Hashimoto cutting off his opponent's left hand fingers and right arm, while Ching Wan spears the samurai through the gut; both warriors getting gravely injured in the process. They then gauge each other with a glare before quietly staring out into the ocean from opposite directions, with Hashimoto stabbing his own foot with his sword to stand up and Bo Ching-wan holding his missing arm. As each men wait to see who will fall over dead first, the story ends with no clear winner.

Cast
Norman Chui as Hashimoto
Damian Lau as Bo Ching-wan
Flora Cheong-Leen as Sing Lam
Paul Chang Chung as Master Han
Eddy Ko as Kenji
Hon Gwok-choi as Bo Ching-wan's master
Gam San as Mr. Fok

Reception
In 2014, Time Out polled several film critics, directors, actors and stunt actors to list their top action films. Duel to the Death was listed at 92nd place on this list.

Notes

External links

1983 films
1983 directorial debut films
1980s Cantonese-language films
Films directed by Ching Siu-tung
Golden Harvest films
Hong Kong martial arts films
Japan in non-Japanese culture
Wuxia films
1980s Hong Kong films